Altan Telgey is a Mongol earth goddess. Her relationship to Etugen is unclear. In Mongolian, Delkhey (Delkhi) literally means earth. In modern Mongolian songs, the term Altan Delkhi is commonly mentioned.

Religion in Mongolia
Mongolian deities